Marie Bracquemond (1 December 1840 – 17 January 1916) was a French Impressionist artist.  She was one of four notable women in the Impressionist movement, along with Mary Cassatt (1844-1926), Berthe Morisot (1841-1895), and Eva Gonzalès (1847-1883).  Bracquemond studied drawing as a child and began showing her work at the Paris Salon when she was still an adolescent.  She never underwent formal art training, but she received limited instruction from Jean-Auguste-Dominique Ingres (1780–1867) and advice from Paul Gauguin (1848–1903) which contributed to her stylistic approach.  

She married noted printmaker Félix Bracquemond (1833–1914), who helped popularize Japanese art in France.  Together, they produced ceramic art for Haviland & Co., a manufacturer of Limoges porcelain. Marie's frequent omission from books on artists is sometimes attributed to the efforts of her husband.  Although Félix participated with the Impressionist exhibitions, he notably disapproved of the movement at which his wife excelled. Indeed, Pierre Bracquemond, their son, stated that his father was jealous of Marie's work, belittled her ambition, and refused to show her paintings to visitors. 

Marie participated in three out of the eight major Impressionist exhibitions, submitting her work to the fourth (1879), fifth (1880), and eighth (1889) group showings. During her lifetime as an artist, Bracquemond produced at least 157 original works, of which only 31 have been located and catalogued in existing collections today, with the rest having disappeared into various private collections without record. Her only two solo exhibitions were held after her death. Some of her most famous works include The Lady in White (1880), On the Terrace at Sèvres (1880), Afternoon Tea (1880), and Under the Lamp (1887).

Early life
She was born Marie Anne Caroline Quivoron on 1 December 1840 in Argenton-en-Landunvez, near Brest, Brittany. She did not enjoy the same upbringing or career as the other well-known female Impressionists – Cassatt, Morisot, Gonzalès. She was the child of an unhappy arranged marriage.  Her mother, Aline Hyacinthe Marie Pasquiou, pursued her life with Émile Langlois, and thereafter they led an unsettled existence, moving from Brittany to the Jura, to Switzerland, and to Limousin, before settling in Étampes, south of Paris. She had one sister, Louise, born in 1849 while her family lived near Ussel (department Corrèze in Limousin) in the ancient abbey Notre-Dame de Bonnaigue.

She began lessons in painting in her teens under the instruction of M. Auguste Vassor, "an old painter who now restored paintings and gave lessons to the young women of the town". She progressed to such an extent that in 1857 she submitted a painting of her mother, sister and old teacher posed in the studio to the Salon which was accepted. She was then introduced to the painter Ingres who advised her and introduced her to two of his students, Flandrin and Signol.

The critic Philippe Burty referred to her as "one of the most intelligent pupils in Ingres' studio". As a student in Ingres' private Parisian studio, she wrote that, "The severity of Monsieur Ingres frightened me ... because he doubted the courage and perseverance of a woman in the field of painting ... He would assign to them only the painting of flowers, of fruits, of still lives, portraits and genre scenes."

She later left Ingres' studio and began receiving commissions for her work, including one from the court of Empress Eugenie for a painting of Cervantes in prison. This evidently pleased, because she was then asked by the Count de Nieuwerkerke, the director-general of French museums, to make important copies in the Louvre.

Family
It was while she was copying Old Masters in the Louvre that she saw Félix Bracquemond, who fell in love with her. His friend, the critic Eugène Montrosier, arranged an introduction and, from then, she and Félix were inseparable. They were engaged for two years before marrying on 5 August 1869, despite her mother's opposition. In 1870, they had their only child, Pierre. Because of the scarcity of good medical care during the War of 1870 and the Paris Commune, Bracquemond's already delicate health deteriorated after her son's birth. Much of what is known of Bracquemond's personal life comes from an unpublished short biography authored by her son, entitled La Vie de Félix et Marie Bracquemond.

Career

Félix and Marie Bracquemond worked together at the Haviland studio at Auteuil where her husband had become artistic director. She designed plates for dinner services and executed large tile panels (once known as faience) depicting Les Muses des arts (The muses of the arts), which were shown at the Universal Exhibition of 1878.  The work is now considered lost.

She began having paintings accepted for the Salon on a regular basis from 1864. As she found the medium constraining, her husband's efforts to teach her etching were only a qualified success. She nevertheless produced nine etchings that were shown at the second exhibition of the Society of Painter-Etchers at the Galeries Durand-Ruel in 1890. Her husband introduced her to new media and to the artists he admired, as well as older masters such as Chardin. She was especially attracted to the Belgian painter Alfred Stevens. Between 1887 and 1890, under the influence of the Impressionists, Bracquemond's style began to change. Her canvases grew larger and her colours intensified. She moved out of doors (part of a movement that came to be known as plein air), and to her husband's disgust, Monet and Degas became her mentors.

Many of her best-known works were painted outdoors, especially in her garden at Sèvres. One of her last paintings was The Artist's Son and Sister in the Garden at Sèvres. Bracquemond participated in the Impressionist exhibitions of 1879, 1880, and 1886. In 1879 and 1880, some of her drawings were published in La Vie Moderne. In 1881, she exhibited five works at the Dudley Gallery in London.

In 1886, Félix Bracquemond met Gauguin through Sisley and brought the impoverished artist home. Gauguin had a decisive influence on Marie Bracquemond and, in particular, he taught her how to prepare her canvas in order to achieve the intense tones she now desired.

Unlike many of her Impressionist contemporaries, Bracquemond spent a great deal of effort planning her pieces. Even though many of her works have a spontaneous feel, she prepared in a traditional way through sketches and drawings. Although she was overshadowed by her well-known husband, the work of the reclusive Marie Bracquemond is considered to have been closer to the ideals of Impressionism. According to their son Pierre, Félix Bracquemond was often resentful of his wife, brusquely rejecting her critique of his work, and refusing to show her paintings to visitors. In an unpublished manuscript written by Pierre about his parents' life, he shares that his father "seldom showed her work to their friends. When he did compliment her, it was in private. Therefore, none of their artists friends paid attention to her works or spoke of her efforts, and when she revealed hopes for success, Félix put her ambition down to 'incurable vanity.'" In 1890, Marie Bracquemond, worn out by the continual household friction and discouraged by lack of interest in her work, abandoned her painting except for a few private works.

She remained a staunch defender of Impressionism throughout her life, even when she was not actively painting. In defense of the style to one of her husband's many attacks on her art, she said, "Impressionism has produced ... not only a new, but a very useful way of looking at things. It is as though all at once a window opens and the sun and air enter your house in torrents."

Death
She died in Paris on January 17, 1916.  On January 23, art critic Arsène Alexandre paid tribute to her memory in the newspaper Le Figaro.  In the article, Alexandre wrote that Bracquemond "was one of those artists ignored, of which the times to come will astonish, both the rare talent and the voluntary shadow in which this talent enveloped itself", and described Bracquemond as an "exquisite painter" whose character "was worthy of the work: sensitive, proud and an almost excessive modesty."

Legacy
Henri Focillon described Bracquemond in 1928 as one of "les trois grandes dames" of Impressionism alongside Berthe Morisot and Mary Cassatt. Feminist art criticism in the 1970s brought increasing attention to women in the Impressionist art movement, and renewed interest in the forgotten work of Marie Bracquemond.  In the 1980s, art historian Tamar Garb popularized women artists like Marie Bracquemond with the publication of Women Impressionists, leading to a new era of research on the subject. Bracquemond was later included in the 2018 exhibit Women in Paris 1850-1900.

Works
There is no catalogue raisonné for Marie Bracquemond. This is an incomplete and unsorted list of public and privately owned paintings, watercolors, and etchings by Marie Bracquemond according to the 1919 exhibition catalog of the Bernheim-Jeune art gallery.  Bracquemond produced at least 81 paintings and oil sketches, 34 watercolors, 23 drawings, and nine etchings. This list does not include her ceramic works. At least two of her works, the ceramic faience panel The Muses (1878) and the painting The Swallow (1880), depicting the Sisleys in a boat on the Seine, are presumed lost.
{{columns-list|colwidth=23em|
Paintings
 La Dame en blanc (1880)
 Sur la terrasse à Sèvres (1880)
 Près de la fenêtre
 Avenue de Bellevue sous la neige
 Portrait de Pierre Bracquemond
 Chrysanthèmes
 Roses
 Le Goûter (1880)
 La Partie de jacquet
 L’Aquarelliste

 Portrait de Marie Bracquemond
 Portrait de Félix Bracquemond (1886)
 On vient d’allumer la lampe (1887)
 Portrait de Pierre Bracquemond
 Bouquet
 Esquisse d’après une aquarelle de G. Moreau
 Dans le jardin (1886)
 Esquisse du tableau: "Sur la terrasse à Sèvres"
 Vue du haut Sèvres
 Vue de Paris
 Etude d’arbres en fleur
 Bouquet près de la fenêtre
 Fleurs dans un vase
 Panier de fraises
 Etude: Coteau de Sèvres
 La Route des Jardies
 Etude à Sèvres
 Au soleil
 Pêches
 Etude d’arbres
 Etude pour "Le Goûter"
 Etude pour "Près de la fenêtre"
 Etude de matin
 Femme lisant
 L’Allée de rhododendrons
 La Pêche aux écrevisses
 Etude: Femme cousant
 Etude de femme (1880)
 Etude pour "La Tasse de café"
 Le Peintre
 Etude d’homme
 Au bord du ruisseau
 Dans un jardin
 Verger à La Chabanne
 Terrasse à La Chabanne
 Le Pilote
 Etude d’homme
 Au bord de la Seine
 Etude pour "La Partie de jacquet"
 La Tricoteuse
 Femme en rose
 Une Ailee a La Chabanne
 Sur l’étang
 Portrait de jeune femme
 Anémones
 Etude (1880)
 Etude
 Etude
 Projet de tableau: "Le Jet d’eau"
 Projet de tableau: "Le Bain"
 Projet de tableau
 Projet de tableau
 Projet de tableau
 Projet de tableau
 Projet de tableau
 Projet de tableau
 Projet de tableau
 Etude de fleurs
 Roses
 Pivoines
 Femme et fleurs
 Etude pour le portrait blanc
 Petite femme rose
 Première communion
 Sur la terrasse de La Chabanne
 Etude pour "Le Goûter"
 La Tasse de café
 Esquisse de "Sur la terrasse à Sèvres"
 Crevettes (1887)
 Narcisses et anémones
 Esquisse de "L’Arbre de Noël"
 Projet de tableau
 Bertrand et Raton, d’après Gustave Moreau
 Etude de tête, pastel
 La Promenade
 Au soleil
 Les Trois Grâces de 1880 (1880)
 Reines-marguerites
 Chrysanthèmes
 Portrait de M Th. Haviland
 bis. Paul et Virginie (plaque de faïence)
Watercolors
 Le Mont-Dore
 Solitude
 Portrait de la Comtesse de Bony de Lavergne
 Etude pour le Mont-Dore
 Le Jardin de l’Ecole Normale à Sèvres
 Une Allée de l’Ecole Normale
 Quatre petites études de femme
 Au bord du ruisseau
 L’Echarpe violette
 Etude
 L’Allée fleurie Femme en deuil Etude Etude Etude de fillette Etude de femme Vues de Divonne Vues de Divonne Vues de Divonne Vues de Divonne Vues de Divonne Vues de Divonne Vues de Divonne Vues de Divonne Vues de Divonne Vues de Divonne Vues de Divonne Vues de Divonne Vues de Divonne Vues de Divonne Vues de Divonne Vues de Divonne Au bord du ruisseau Cueillette des pommes (1886)
Drawings
 Le Mur du parc La Crèche La Poésie La Foire de St-Cloud Etude pour "Les Gants" Etude Etude Etude de jeune homme Portrait de Marie Bracquemond Portrait de Marie Bracquemond Portrait de M Chaudesaigues Portrait de M Quivoron Portrait de M Quivoron Sur la branche Etude de visage La Danse Etude de robe Page d’album Page d’album Projet pour un plat Croquis Près de la fenêtre Les Beaux Arts, projet de décorationEtchings
 Germinie Lacerteux Le Petit malade Le Tableau Portrait de Gustave Geffroy Portrait de M Quivoron Portrait de Marie Bracquemond (1888)
 Portrait de M Béraldi Portrait de M Guy Pellion Les Ballons}}

 Selected exhibitions 

See also
List of women artists exhibited at the 1893 World's Columbian Exposition
Society of Modern Women Artists

Notes and references

Further reading

Bouillon, Jean-Paul (2010). "Félix et Marie Bracquemond à l’atelier d’Auteuil". In Antoine d'Albis, Laurens d'Albis, Audray Gay-Mazuel & Florence Stitine (ed.) Émaux Atmosphériques: La Céramique Impressionistes. N.Chaudun. pp. 51-59. .
Criss, Jennifer T. (2007). " Japonisme and beyond in the art of Marie Bracquemond, Mary Cassatt, and Berthe Morisot, 1867–1895". (PhD). University of Pennsylvania.
DeWitte, Debra J. (2017). "Public Exhibitions of Drawing in Paris, France (1860–1890): A Study in Data-Driven Art History" (PhD). University of Texas at Dallas.
Isaacson, & Bouillon, J. P. (1980). The Crisis of Impressionism, 1878-1882 : [exhibition] the University of Michigan Museum of Art, 2 November 1979-6 January 1980. University of Michigan Museum of Art. 
 Speiss, Dominique. Encyclopedia of Impressionists: From the Precursors to the Heirs'', Edita, 1992. 
 Webmuseum, Paris.

1840 births
1916 deaths
People from Finistère
French women painters
French Impressionist painters
19th-century French painters
20th-century French painters
20th-century French women artists
19th-century French women artists